HMS G3 was a British G-class submarine built for the Royal Navy during World War I.

Description
The G-class submarines were designed by the Admiralty in response to a rumour that the Germans were building double-hulled submarines for overseas duties. They displaced  on the surface and  submerged. The G-class submarines had a crew of 30 officers and ratings. They had a partial double hull.

For surface running, the boats were powered by two  Vickers two-stroke diesel engines, each driving one propeller shaft. When submerged each propeller was driven by a  electric motor. They could reach  on the surface and  underwater.

The boats were intended to be armed with one 21-inch (53.3 cm) torpedo tube in the bow and two 18-inch (45 cm) torpedo tubes on the beam. This was revised, however, while they were under construction, the 21-inch tube was moved to the stern and two additional 18-inch tubes were added in the bow. They carried two 21-inch and eight 18-inch torpedoes. The G-class submarines were also armed with a single  deck gun.

Career
Like the rest of her class, G3s role was to patrol an area of the North Sea in search of German U-boats.

In December 1921 G3, out of commission, was being towed north to be broken up for scrap when she broke her tether and came ashore at Scalby Mills, north of Scarborough. The submarine later broke free from the shore and drifted back out to sea. She then drifted south, finally running aground under Buckton cliffs in Filey Bay, bow first. A local man, John Webster bought the salvage rights to the vessel and the wreck was scrapped. Lumps of the hulk were lifted up the sheer cliffs using ropes and pulleys, the salvers using rope ladders for access.

Notes

References

External links
History and description of wreck

 

British G-class submarines
World War I submarines of the United Kingdom
Ships built in Chatham
Royal Navy ship names
1916 ships